Sarabeleh (also Romanized as Sarābeleh, Sarābīeh, and Sar Ābleh; also known as Sārābāla and Sarābīyeh) is a village in Miyan Darband Rural District, in the Central District of Kermanshah County, Kermanshah Province, Iran. At the 2006 census, its population was 116, in 33 families.

References 

Populated places in Kermanshah County